Elachista oukaimedenensis is a moth in the family Elachistidae. It was described by Traugott-Olsen in 1988. It is found in Spain and Morocco.

References

Moths described in 1988
oukaimedenensis
Moths of Africa
Moths of Europe